The 2020–21 Serbian First League was the 16th season of the Serbian First League since its establishment.

League format
The league consisted of 18 teams: ten teams from the 2019–20 Serbian First League and eight new teams promoted from 2019–20 Serbian League. Teams played each other in double round-robin format, with top two teams being promoted to Serbian SuperLiga and bottom eight teams being relegated to Serbian League.

Team changes
The following teams have changed division since the 2019–20 season.

To First League
Promoted from Serbian League
 Borac 1926
 Dubočica
 IMT
 Jagodina
 Loznica
 Radnički Sremska Mitrovica
 Sloga
 Železničar

From First League
Relegated to Serbian League
 Sinđelić
 Smederevo 1924

Promoted to 2020–21 Serbian SuperLiga
 Bačka
 Metalac
 Novi Pazar
 Zlatibor

Teams

Personnel, Kits and Main sponsor

Note: Flags indicate national team as has been defined under FIFA eligibility rules. Players and Managers may hold more than one non-FIFA nationality.

Nike is the official ball supplier for Serbian First League.

Kelme is the official sponsor of the Referee's Committee of the Football Association of Serbia.

Grafičar is affiliated and branched with Red Star Belgrade

Managerial changes

Foreign players
Foreign players: The number of foreign players that clubs can use during the game is four.

Transfers
For the list of transfers involving First League clubs during 2020–21 season, please see: List of Serbian football transfers summer 2020.

League table

Results

Individual statistics

Top goalscorers
As of matches played on 19 May 2021.

Hat-tricks

References

External links
 Official website
 srbijasport.net

Serbian First League seasons
2020–21 in Serbian football leagues
Serbia